Robert Stoddard may refer to:

 Robert Stoddard, American musician in the band The Dogs D'Amour
 Bob Stoddard (Robert Lyle Stoddard, born 1957), Major League Baseball pitcher
 Robert Waring Stoddard (1906–1984), American businessman and one of the founders of the anti-communist John Birch Society

See also
Robert Stoddart (born 1950), Canadian swimmer